A List of Czech films of the 2020s.

References

2010s
Lists of 2020s films
Films